Adhami is a surname. Notable people with the surname include:

 Loghman Adhami (born 1949), Iranian violinist and composer
 Vangjel Adhami (born 1948), Albanian chess master

See also
 Adami (surname)
 Adham